Daniel Tan Barlaser (born 18 January 1997) is an English professional footballer who plays as a midfielder for EFL Championship club Middlesbrough.

Career
Living in Rowlands Gill, Barlaser started his career at local youth team Swalwell Juniors as well as playing for the Hookergate Comprehensive school football team where he was educated before being signed by the Newcastle United academy in 2006.

After training with the first team squad, he was handed his first start for the club by manager Rafa Benítez on 18 January 2017 when he started the game in a 3–1 FA Cup win against Birmingham City. He continued his run in the team when he started against Oxford United in a 3–0 loss.

Barlaser made his debut in the EFL Cup in August 2017 against Nottingham Forest, a match they lost 3–2 after extra-time.

On 19 January 2018, he agreed to move on loan to Crewe Alexandra until the end of the season, and made his Crewe and Football League debut in a home league game against Wycombe Wanderers on 20 January 2018, coming on as a second-half substitute. On 9 April 2018, the loan spell was prematurely ended with Barlaser returning to Newcastle having made four appearances (all as substitutes).

In July 2019, Newcastle United announced that Barlaser extended his contract with the team and would join Rotherham United on loan for the 2019–20 season.

On 2 October 2020, Barlaser completed a permanent move to Rotherham United for an undisclosed fee, on a three-year deal. Barlaser was awarded the EFL League One Player of the Month award for December 2021 after scoring four goals across the course of the month.

On 29 January 2023, Barlaser signed for Championship club Middlesbrough for an undisclosed fee.

International career
Despite being born in England, Barlaser qualified for Turkey through his father. He is a youth international for the Turkish Football Federation at the U16 and U17 levels.

On 1 June 2015, Barlaser was called up to the England U18s.

Career statistics

Honours
Rotherham United
League One runner-up: 2021–22
EFL Trophy: 2021–22

References

External links

1997 births
Living people
Footballers from Gateshead
English footballers
Turkish footballers
Association football midfielders
Newcastle United F.C. players
Crewe Alexandra F.C. players
Accrington Stanley F.C. players
Rotherham United F.C. players
English Football League players
Turkey youth international footballers
England youth international footballers
English people of Turkish descent
Turkish people of English descent
Middlesbrough F.C. players